
DAMAC can refer to:

Organizations
DAMAC Properties, a property development company
DAMAC Maison Hotels & Resorts, the hospitality division of DAMAC Properties
Damac F.C., a Saudi Arabian professional sports club based in Khamis Mushait city

Buildings
DAMAC Residenze, a supertall skyscraper under construction in Dubai Marina
DAMAC Paramount Hotel & Residences, a residential and hotel tower under construction in Downtown Dubai
DAMAC Maison-Paramount Tower 1, 2, and 3, a set of 250-metre-tall residential towers under construction in Downtown Dubai 
Dubai Marina (Dubai Metro), a rapid transit station on the red line of the Dubai Metro

Other uses
 "Me Damac", a track on the album Ronald Dregan: Dreganomics by Mac Dre

See also
 Damak (disambiguation)

Damac Properties